Torkhow is a town and Tehsil (a subdivision) of Chitral District in the Khyber-Pakhtunkhwa province of Pakistan. Torkhow is located 108 km from the main city of Chitral, on the border of Wakhan valley of Afghanistan). Shagram is the administrative center of the Valley. A Higher Secondary school and Rural Health Center has been built here. The language of Chitral, Khowar, originated from this area. Most of the villages are situated on the right bank of Torkhow River, only Washich village is on the left bank.

Villages in Torkhow Valley 
 1. Istaru
 2. Werkhup
 3. Rayeen
 4. Merlp
 5. Sherjuli
 6. Shagram
 7. Khot
 8. Washich
 9. Ujnu
 10. Rech
 11. Buzund
 12. Zanglasht
 13. Shotkhar

Educational Institutions
Islamia Model School Torkhow Rayeen Chitral
Government High School For Girls, Istaru Torkhow, Mastuj
Arif public school washich torkhow (School)
Aga Khan School, Buzund, in the Torkhow
Govt. higher secondary school Shagram Torkhow

References 

Populated places in Chitral District